The Presidents Committee to Study the United States Military Assistance Program ("Draper Committee.") was a bipartisan committee, created in November 1958 by U.S. President Dwight D. Eisenhower to undertake a completely independent, objective, and non-partisan analysis of the military assistance aspects of the 1949 Mutual Defense Assistance Act.

In 1965, William Henry Draper Jr. and others founded the Population Crisis Committee, which later changed its name to Population Action International. This organization is not the same as the Draper Committee.

Members 

The committee was composed of:
 William Henry Draper Jr. (chairman), board chairman of the Mexican Light & Power Co. and retired World War II major general
 Dillon Anderson, Houston lawyer, onetime presidential National Security Advisor
 Joseph M. Dodge, Detroit banker, onetime Budget Director
 Alfred Maximilian Gruenther, American Red Cross president, onetime Supreme Allied Commander in Europe
 Marx Leva, Washington lawyer, onetime Assistant Secretary of Defense
 John J. McCloy, New York banker, onetime High Commissioner in Germany
 George C. McGhee, Dallas businessman, onetime Assistant Secretary of State
 General Joseph T. McNarney (ret.), onetime commander of U.S. forces in Europe
 Admiral Arthur W. Radford (ret.), onetime Joint Chiefs of Staff chairman
 James E. Webb, Oklahoma oilman, onetime Under Secretary of State, onetime Budget Director

References

External links
Records of the Draper Committee (U.S. President's Committee to Study the U.S. Military Assistance Program), Dwight D. Eisenhower Presidential Library 

Executive Office of the President of the United States
Presidency of Dwight D. Eisenhower
History of diplomacy